Danish Council may refer to:

 Danish Council of State, the Privy Council of Denmark
 Danish Press Council, a Danish independent public tribunal press council under the Ministry of Justice
 Danish Refugee Council, a private Danish humanitarian organisation